Otto is an unincorporated community in Roane County, West Virginia, United States.

References 

Unincorporated communities in West Virginia
Unincorporated communities in Roane County, West Virginia